Camillia Monet (born Camillia Sanes ) is an American actress and film producer. She began her career in acting, appearing in films such as War of the Worlds (2005), directed by Steven Spielberg, playing opposite Tom Cruise, and Seabiscuit (2003), opposite Tobey Maguire.

Monet is the CEO and founder of Esperanza Productions LLC, located at Hollywood’s Paramount Studios, as well as acting & 1-on-1 coaching studio, Monet Studios. Esperanza Productions writes & produces films, television, short form content and commercials on all platforms. As opposed to Monet Studios, which provides coaching and audition preparation both locally in Los Angeles and globally via video platforms like Zoom.

Education and career

Education
In her youth, Monet attended the high school for creative and performing arts. She was later chosen to attend the Pennsylvania governors school for the arts. As an undergraduate, Monet attended at The University of the Arts to study acting on a full scholarship. She went on to receive her masters from the prestigious Yale school of drama. While working alongside Tom Cruise and Steven Spielberg she was inspired to continue her filmmaking education and graduated from UCLA’s Producing Program.

Acting career
Monet had her start in theater in Manhattan, working at theaters such as The Roundabout Theatre with Bill Irwin, originating the role of Celestina in “Cloud Tectonics” at Playwright’s Horizon and later touring the nation in the role, and becoming a member of the Blue Light Theatre Co. She worked for several years on and off-Broadway before moving to Los Angeles.She has had a successful career in film and television, appearing on shows such as Law & Order, Saving Grace, Cold Case, and the Emmy Award-winning The Shield.

Monet has also worked as a private acting coach, professor at New York University and Woodbury University, and adjunct professor at UCLA.

Current Career - Monet Studios, Esperanza Productions
After graduating from the UCLA producers program, Monet founded Esperanza Productions. Monet is responsible for the over-all artistic agenda at Esperanza: story development, attaching talent, sourcing and securing financing, implementing schedules and over-seeing and maintaining budget. Since its inception, she has guided Esperanza through the production of over twenty projects, most recently Devil May Call, which was acquired by Lionsgate and distributed through mainstream digital platforms such as Netflix and Redbox.

She also provides on-camera and in-studio coaching and training for actors in Hollywood and worldwide through Monet Studios.  And, Monet is an instructor at the Yale School of Drama.

Monet has been named one of the top female entrepreneurs of 2015 in Hollywood and was praised for her work in female empowerment by Splash Magazine. She appears as a Guest Artist and Speaker at UCLA, Rome University, Scuola Di Teatro in Bologna, Italy, and Hollywood Women's Film Institute.

Family and personal life
Both parents of Monet moved to the United States in the early 1960s from the US Virgin Islands. Monet was born in Philadelphia, Pennsylvania, the daughter of Esperanza P. Sanes, for whom she named her company. She is the youngest of six siblings: five sisters, all in various aspects of law enforcement, and one brother, a freelance artist. Monet married Daniel Chisholm on May 30, 2006 In Taormina, Italy. She is the cousin of Tony Vega, a salsa singer and band leader. When asked what makes her company and philosophy stand out, Monet replied, “Of course we invest in the product, of course we invest in the content, of course we invest in the distribution; but our absolute number one goal is, we invest in the people. That’s who we are."

Filmography

Films (producer)
 Jenny  (2013) - Producer 
 Tale of Two Dads  (2013) - Producer
 Devil May Call (2013) - Producer
 Love or Whatever (2012)
 Apples ( 2010) 
 The Memory Of When ( 2009)
 Celestina (2008) - Producer
 The Winged Man (2008) - Producer
 War Cry (2007)
 Looking For Some Posse ( 2005)

Films (actor)
Low (1995) - Brenda White
From a High Place (1998) - Victoria
Building Bombs (2000) - Isobel
Book of Kings (short) (2002) - Carol
 Seabiscuit (2003) - Molina Rojo Woman
The Silent Cross (2003) - Carmen
Lookin' for Some Posse (short) (2005) - Girl on Horse
 War of the Worlds (2005) - News Producer
 Apples

Television (actor)
 The Shield  (14 episodes, 2002–2005) - Aurora Aceveda
 Saving Grace   (4 episodes, 2007–2009) - Marrisa
 Cold Case  (2 episodes, "Static" and "War at Home", 2006) - Alegria
 Guiding Light  (1 episode, Episode #1.12774, 1997) - Olivia
 Law & Order  (1 episode, "Burned", 1997) - Ellen Rattinger
 The Agency  (1 episode, "Soft Kills", 2003) - Adalia Montes

References

External links

American television actresses
American film actresses
Living people
Year of birth missing (living people)
21st-century American women